Jefferson Randolph Kean, M.D. (27 June 1860 – 4 September 1950) was an American military surgeon who served with the U.S. Army.

Early years 
Jefferson R. Kean was born in 1860 in Lynchburg, Virginia, to Robert Garlick Hill Kean and Jane Nicholas Randolph Kean. He was the great-grandson of Thomas Jefferson. Kean obtained his M.D. from the University of Virginia in 1883, where he was a member of the Phi Beta Kappa honor society.

Military career 
Kean was commissioned into the U.S. Army in 1884 as an assistant surgeon. During the first eight years of his career, Kean was stationed on the Western frontier attached to the Ninth Cavalry, eventually taking part in Ghost Dance War against the Sioux. In 1892, Kean was stationed in Florida and would remain there for the next five years.

Spanish–American War 
With the outbreak of the Spanish–American War, Kean was attached to the 7th Army Corps and deployed to Cuba. He would remain in Cuba with the provisional military government until 1902. During this time, Kean served Department Chief Surgeon under General Fitzhugh Lee and later Superintendent of Department of Charities under General Leonard Wood.

Peacetime career 
Upon his return from Cuba, Kean was made Assistant to the Surgeon General, position he would hold until 1906, when he was returned to Cuba as the adviser for the Department of Sanitation for the second provisional government until 1909. From 1909 to 1913, Kean was in charge of the Sanitary Division of the Surgeon General's office and developed a system for stockpiling emergency medical field supplies during his tenure. With the ample experience he gained through his roles ensuring the sanitation of public services in Cuba, Kean would later write the laws to organize the Sanitary Departments of Cuba and Puerto Rico.

He was president of the U.S. Association of Military Surgeons from 1914 to 1915.

First World War 
Although the United States did not formally enter the First World War until April 1917, from 1916 organized the American Red Cross's Department of Military Relief and organized and equipped thirty-two base hospitals until the American entry into the war.

With the entry of the United States into the First World War, Kean was deployed to France as the chief of the U.S. Ambulance Service with the French Army, for which he would receive the Distinguished Service Medal, until June 1918, when he was promoted to brigadier general and made Deputy Chief Surgeon of the American Expeditionary Force until the end of the war. Kean would return home having earned the Legion of Honor for his service in France.

Between the wars 
Following his return from France, Kean held key positions in government commissions even after his retirement from the military in 1924. Kean was appointed member of the U.S. Commission for the construction of the National Expansion Memorial in by the President Franklin D. Roosevelt in 1934. As a direct descendant of Thomas Jefferson, he founded the Monticello Association in 1913 and was a member of the U.S. Commission to erect the Thomas Jefferson Memorial in Washington, D.C. in 1938.

He was awarded the Gorgas Medal by the Association of Military Surgeons in 1942.

Personal life 
Kean married Louise Hurlbut Young in 1894. Their marriage would produce two children, Martha Jefferson and Robert Hill. Louise died in 1915. Kean remarried in 1919 to Cornelia Knox.

Jefferson Randolph Kean died in September 1950, aged 90, in Washington D.C. He is buried in Monticello, VA.

References

External links

1860 births
1950 deaths
University of Virginia School of Medicine alumni
People from Lynchburg, Virginia
American surgeons
United States Army generals of World War I
American military personnel of the Spanish–American War
United States Army generals
Recipients of the Distinguished Service Medal (US Army)
Military personnel from Virginia